Gary Woolcombe (born 4 August 1982) is a British former professional boxer who competed from 2003 to 2009. He held the British super welterweight title from 2007 to 2008.

Professional boxing record

References

1982 births
Living people
English male boxers
People from Lewisham
Boxers from Greater London
Light-middleweight boxers